Niall James McDonnell (born 12 October 1979, Strabane, County Tyrone) is a Northern Irish left-handed batsman cricket player. He was included in the Ireland cricket team squad when the Pakistani cricket team toured Ireland in 2011.

He played two matches against MCC team and scored a century against them at College Park. In February 2016, he was appointed assistant coach of the North West Warriors under Bobby Rao.

McDonnell made his first-class cricket debut for the North West Warriors against Northern Knights in the 2017 Inter-Provincial Championship on 30 May 2017.

References

External links
 
 

1979 births
Living people
Irish cricketers
Irish cricket coaches
People from Strabane
Cricketers from Northern Ireland
North West Warriors cricketers